The 2015 Philadelphia Freedoms season was the 15th season of the franchise (in its current incarnation) in World TeamTennis (WTT).

Led by the strong mixed doubles play of Taylor Townsend and Marcelo Melo, the Freedoms had only 5 wins against 9 losses but qualified for the playoffs for the second consecutive season. The Freedoms lost the Eastern Conference Championship Match, 25–9, to the Washington Kastles.

Season recap

Draft
At the WTT draft on March 16, 2015, the Freedoms passed on making any selections in the marquee portion of the draft. In the roster portion of the draft, the Freedoms protected Taylor Townsend and 2014 WTT Male Most Valuable Player Marcelo Melo. They left Victoria Duval and Liezel Huber unprotected in the second round and instead chose Robby Ginepri. The Freedoms could not protect Frank Dancevic in the fourth round, because they already had two full-time male players. Huber was still available, and the Freedoms selected her to complete their roster.

Other player transactions
On June 29, 2015, the Freedoms announced that Liezel Huber would miss the 2015 season due to health concerns, and she was removed from the active roster. The Freedoms also announced that they had signed Coco Vandeweghe, Asia Muhammad and Abigail Spears as substitute players. Vandeweghe was scheduled to play in the team's first three matches (all on the road), followed by Muhammad playing in the next four and Spears playing in the final seven.

Second-half turnaround
After winning their opening match on the road, the Freedoms lost their next six consecutive matches and found themselves with 1 win and 6 losses at the midway point of the season with the four-time defending WTT champion Washington Kastles coming to town.

The July 20 home match against the Kastles got off to a difficult start when the Freedoms dropped the opening set of men's singles, 5–2. But Taylor Townsend responded by taking a 5–1 set win over Madison Brengle in women's singles to give the Freedoms a 7–6 lead. Robby Ginepri and Marcelo Melo won a tiebreaker over Sam Querrey and Leander Paes in men's doubles to increase the lead to 12–10. But the Kastles won the next set of women's doubles and took a 15–13 lead to the final set. Melo and Townsend dominated Paes and Anastasia Rodionova in the final set of mixed doubles, 5–1, to give the Freedoms an 18–16 victory.

After a night off, the Freedoms went on the road to face the Boston Lobsters looking to avenge an early-season home loss. The Lobsters took the opening set of mixed doubles in a tiebreaker. But the Freedoms responded by winning the final four sets on their way to a 24–14 victory. Townsend gave the Freedoms a 9–5 lead in the match when she took the women's singles set from Irina Falconi, 5–0. Townsend won 20 of the 26 points played in the set. Following two sets won by the Freedoms in tiebreakers, Melo and Ginepri closed out the match with a 5–1 men's doubles set win.

The Freedoms returned home the following evening to face the Austin Aces, who entered the match with 8 wins and 0 losses. The Freedoms stunned the Aces by winning the first four sets to take a 20–9 lead. Ginepri opened with a 5–2 set win in men's singles, and Townsend followed by taking the women's singles set, 5–3. Ginepri and Melo won the men's doubles, 5–3, and Townsend teamed with Abigail Spears for a 5–1 set win in women's doubles. The Aces salvaged the final set of mixed doubles, 5–1, to cut the Freedoms' lead to 21–14 and send the match to extended play. But Townsend and Melo won the first game of extra time to give the Freedoms their third consecutive victory by a score of 22–14.

The Freedoms followed their three-match winning streak with two straight losses. Yet, with 4 wins and 8 losses and two matches remaining, the Freedoms controlled their own playoff destiny. The Lobsters were in second place in the Eastern Conference with 4 wins and 7 losses, and the Freedoms had a home-and-home series scheduled with them to close the season. Following the home-and-home, the Lobsters were scheduled to close their season on the road against the Kastles. Therefore, if the Freedoms could sweep the home-and-home series, they would clinch a playoff berth.

The Lobsters hosted the first match, and Ginepri put the Freedoms in front early with a 5–2 set win in men's singles. The Lobsters took the women's singles by the same score to tie the match at 7. Ginepri and Melo followed by winning the men's doubles set, 5–3, to give the Freedoms a 12–10 lead. But the Lobsters won the women's doubles set by the same score to tie the match at 15, heading to the final set. Melo and Townsend converted two of three break point opportunities while thwarting all five break point opportunities they gave the Lobsters and won the set, 5–2, for a 20–17 victory.

Returning home with a chance to clinch a playoff berth in their final regular-season match, the Freedoms got off to a quick start when Ginepri won the opening set of men's singles, 5–0. But the Lobsters charged back, winning the next three sets to take a 15–12 lead to the final set. Melo and Townsend controlled the early portion of the fifth set of mixed doubles with two breaks of serve on two opportunities, and it looked as though the Freedoms might win the match outright with a lopsided final set win. But the Lobsters broke back late, and the Freedoms won the set by a score of 5–3 to cut the Lobsters' lead in the match to 18–17 and set up extended play. Melo served the first game of extended play, and the Freedoms quickly fell behind in the game, 3–1. The Freedoms successfully defended the first two break points, but the Lobsters ultimately broke at 3 all to win the match, 19–17. The Freedoms would have to wait for the result of the Lobsters' final match to learn their fate.

With an opportunity to grab a playoff spot, the Lobsters fell to the Kastles, 22–14, in their final regular-season match, clinching a playoff berth for the Freedoms. Since the Freedoms and Lobsters finished the regular season with identical 5–9 records, the WTT standings tiebreaker system was used to break the tie. The teams split their four regular-season meetings. So, the tie was broken by comparing games won in head-to-head matches, which favored the Freedoms, 78–71. The biggest contribution to this margin was made by the Freedoms' 24–14 road victory over the Lobsters on July 22.

Playoffs
The Freedoms visited the Washington Kastles to play the Eastern Conference Championship Match on July 30, 2015. It was a dominant performance for Washington, as the Kastles took all five sets en route to a 25–9 victory for their fifth consecutive Eastern Conference title. Martina Hingis teamed with Leander Paes in the opening set of mixed doubles for a 5–1 set win over Taylor Townsend and Marcelo Melo. Townsend and Coco Vandeweghe were able to push Hingis and Anastasia Rodionova to a tiebreaker in the fourth set of women's doubles before dropping the set. Madison Brengle saved three break points and won both 3-all points for a 5–2 set win in women's singles over Vandeweghe. Paes and Sam Querrey took the men's doubles set, 5–2, over Melo and Robby Ginepri. Querrey closed out the match with a 5–0 whitewash of Ginepri in men's singles.

Event chronology
 March 16, 2015: The Freedoms protected Taylor Townsend and Marcelo Melo, chose Robby Ginepri as a new addition to the team and selected returning team member Liezel Huber whom they had left unprotected at the WTT draft.
 June 29, 2015: The Freedoms announced Liezel Huber would miss the 2015 season due to health concerns and removed her from the active roster. The Freedoms signed Coco Vandeweghe, Asia Muhammad and Abigail Spears as substitute players.
 July 29, 2015: With a record of 5 wins and 9 losses, the Freedoms clinched a playoff berth when the Washington Kastles defeated the Boston Lobsters, 22–14.
 July 30, 2015: The Freedoms lost the Eastern Conference Championship Match, 25–9, to the Washington Kastles.

Draft picks
Since the Freedoms had the worse record of the two conference championship losers in 2014, they selected fourth from the bottom (fourth) in each round of the draft. Unlike previous seasons in which WTT conducted its Marquee Player Draft and its Roster Player Draft on different dates about one month apart, the league conducted a single draft at the Indian Wells Tennis Garden in Indian Wells, California on March 16, 2015. The selections made by the Freedoms are shown in the table below.

Match log

Regular season
{| align="center" border="1" cellpadding="2" cellspacing="1" style="border:1px solid #aaa"
|-
! colspan="2" style="background:#0025BD; color:white" | Legend
|-
! bgcolor="ccffcc" | Freedoms Win
! bgcolor="ffbbbb" | Freedoms Loss
|-
! colspan="2" | Home team in CAPS
|}

Playoffs
{| align="center" border="1" cellpadding="2" cellspacing="1" style="border:1px solid #aaa"
|-
! colspan="2" style="background:#0025BD; color:white" | Legend
|-
! bgcolor="ccffcc" | Freedoms Win
! bgcolor="ffbbbb" | Freedoms Loss
|-
! colspan="2" | Home team in CAPS
|}
Eastern Conference Championship Match

Team personnel
References:

On-court personnel
  Josh Cohen – Head Coach
  Robby Ginepri
  Liezel Huber (injured, did not play)
  Marcelo Melo
  Asia Muhammad
  Abigail Spears
  Taylor Townsend
  Coco Vandeweghe

Front office
 Billie Jean King – Owner
 Barbara Perry – General Manager
 Lisa Raymond – Player Personnel Director

Notes:

Statistics
Players are listed in order of their game-winning percentage provided they played in at least 40% of the Freedoms' games in that event, which is the WTT minimum for qualification for league leaders in individual statistical categories.

Men's singles – regular season

Women's singles – regular season

Men's doubles – regular season

Women's doubles – regular season

Mixed doubles – regular season

Team totals – regular season

Men's singles – playoffs

Women's singles – playoffs

Men's doubles – playoffs

Women's doubles – playoffs

Mixed doubles – playoffs

Team totals – playoffs

Men's singles – all matches

Women's singles – all matches

Men's doubles – all matches

Women's doubles – all matches

Mixed doubles – all matches

Team totals – all matches

Transactions
 March 16, 2015: The Freedoms protected Taylor Townsend and Marcelo Melo, chose Robby Ginepri as a new addition to the team and selected returning team member Liezel Huber whom they had left unprotected at the WTT draft.
 March 16, 2015: The Freedoms left Victoria Azarenka, Frank Dancevic and Victoria Duval unprotected in the WTT Draft effectively making them free agents.
 June 29, 2015: The Freedoms announced Liezel Huber would miss the 2015 season due to health concerns and removed her from the active roster. The Freedoms signed Coco Vandeweghe, Asia Muhammad and Abigail Spears as substitute players.

Individual achievements
Taylor Townsend was fourth in WTT in winning percentage in mixed doubles. Marcelo Melo was sixth in WTT in winning percentage in mixed doubles.

See also

References

External links
Philadelphia Freedoms official website
World TeamTennis official website

Philadelphia Freedoms season
Philadelphia Freedoms 2015
Philadelphia Freedoms season